This is a list of seasons played by Portsmouth Football Club in English and European football, from 1899 (the year of the club's first FA Cup entry and elected straight into the first division of the Southern League) to the most recent completed season. Football was played in the city of Portsmouth from the 1850s and was popular for sailors and dockers to play in the city. The current club was founded in 1898 with John Brickwood, owner of the local brewery, as chairman, and Frank Brettell as the club's first manager.

A common myth is that the club's first goalkeeper was Sir Arthur Conan Doyle. While Conan Doyle did play as AC Smith for an amateur side, Portsmouth Athletic Football Club, that flourished from 1882 to 1894, the first goalkeeper of the professional era was Matt Reilly who previously played for the successful Royal Artillery team.

Portsmouth was formed to replace the defunct Royal Artillery Portsmouth club, and elected straight into the first division of the Southern League. The club's first league match was played at Chatham Town on 2 September 1899 (a 1–0 victory), followed three days later by the first match at Fratton Park against local rivals Southampton. That first season was hugely successful, with the club winning 20 out of 28 league matches, earning them runners-up spot in the Southern League. The league was won for the first time in the 1901–02 season, by which time Brettell had been replaced by club captain Bob Blyth as manager.

The 1906–07 season was highlighted by the visit of Manchester United to Fratton Park in the FA Cup, which generated a record attendance of 24,329. A 2–2 draw meant a replay in Manchester, and Portsmouth recorded a famous 2–1 win. However, this record attendance was surpassed two seasons later when Sheffield Wednesday visited Fratton for the second round of the new FA Cup.

1910–11 saw Portsmouth relegated, but with the recruitment of Robert Brown as manager the team were promoted the next season.

The club has won the League Championship twice, the FA Cup twice, never won the League Cup, the Charity Shield once (shared).

This list details the club's achievements in all major competitions, and the top scorers for each season. Top scorers in bold were also the top scorers in the English league that season. Records of competitions such as the Hampshire Senior Cup are not included due to them being considered of less importance than the FA Cup and the League Cup.

Non-Football League era

Non-Football League era (Western League)

Football League era

Key

 P = Played
 W = Games won
 D = Games drawn
 L = Games lost
 GF = Goals for
 GA = Goals against
 Pts = Points
 Pos = Final position
 Div 1 = Football League First Division
 Div 2 = Football League Second Division
 Div 3 = Football League Third Division
 Div 3(S) = Football League Third Division South
 Div 4 = Football League Fourth Division
 Prem = Premier League
 Champ = EFL Championship
 Lg1 = EFL League One
 Lg2 = EFL League Two
 n/a = Not applicable
 INT = Intermediate Round
 GS = Group Stage
 R1 = Round 1
 R2 = Round 2
 R3 = Round 3
 R4 = Round 4
 R5 = Round 5
 QF = Quarter-Finals
 SF = Semi-Finals
 RU = Runners-up
 W = Winners

Note: bold text indicates a competition won.
''Note 2: Where fields are left blank, the club did not participate in a competition that season.

Footnotes

References

Seasons
 
English football club seasons
Portsmouth-related lists